Overbrook is the name of several places:

United States of America
Overbrook, Delaware
Overbrook Shores, Delaware
Overbrook, Georgia
Overbrook, Kansas
Overbrook, New Jersey
Overbrook, Oklahoma
Overbrook, Philadelphia, a neighborhood
Overbrook station
Overbrook (Pittsburgh), a neighborhood
Overbrook (Greenville, South Carolina) 

Canada
Overbrook, Ottawa, a neighborhood

Other
Overbrook Hospital for the Insane in Cedar Grove, New Jersey
Overbrook School for the Blind in Overbrook, Philadelphia, Pennsylvania
Overbrook Entertainment, entertainment company
Overbrook High School (disambiguation)
Overbrook (Nashville, Tennessee) NRHP building